Taras Shevchenko Square is a Lubny city square.

External links
 «Пісенне Посулля» Lubny Rada site (Ukrainian)

Lubny
Parks in Ukraine
Tourist attractions in Poltava Oblast